TRC-150094 is a drug which acts as a metabolic modulator which restores metabolic flexibility. It has been shown to improve insulin resistance and hyperglycemia, and is in Phase III human clinical trials for the treatment of Cardiometabolic-Based Chronic Disease (CMBCD) by improving dysglycemia, dyslipidemia and hypertension.

References 

Drugs
Thyroid
Hormones